The word bit is a colloquial expression referring to specific coins in various coinages throughout the world.

United States

In the US, the bit is equal to ¢. In the U.S., the "bit" as a designation for money dates from the colonial period, when the most common unit of currency used was the Spanish dollar, also known as "piece of eight", which was worth 8 Spanish silver reales.  $ or 1 silver real was 1 "bit". 

With the adoption of the decimal U.S. currency in 1794, there was no longer a U.S. coin worth $, but "two bits" remained in the language with the meaning of $.  Because there was no 1-bit coin, a dime (10¢) was sometimes called a short bit and 15¢ a long bit.  (The picayune, which was originally real or bit (¢), was similarly transferred to the US nickel.)

In addition, Spanish coinage, like other foreign coins, continued to be widely used and allowed as legal tender by Chapter XXII of the Act of April 10, 1806 until the Coinage Act of 1857 discontinued the practice.   

Robert Louis Stevenson describes his experience with bits in Across the Plains, (1892) p.144:

"Two bits" or "two bit" continues in general use as a colloquial expression, for 25¢, or a quarter dollar as in the song catchphrase "Shave and a Haircut, two bits." As an adjective, "two-bit" describes something cheap or unworthy.

Roger Miller's song "King of the Road" features the lines: Ah, but two hours of pushin' broom buys an / Eight by twelve four-bit room referring to signs stating "Rooms to let, 50¢."

In the early 1930s, Crown Records was a US record label which sold records for only  25¢. The company advertised on their sleeves, "2 Hits for 2 Bits."

Another example of this use of "bit" can be found in the poem "Six-Bits Blues" by Langston Hughes, which includes the following couplet: Gimme six bits' worth o'ticket / On a train that runs somewhere.…

The expression also survives in the sports cheer "Two bits, four bits, six bits, a dollar … all for (player's name), stand up and holler!"

The New York Stock Exchange continued to list stock prices in $ until June 24, 1997, at which time it started listing in $.  It did not fully implement decimal listing until January 29, 2001.

Danish West Indies
From 1905 to 1917, the Danish West Indies used the bit as part of its currency system.  In 1904, two new currency denominations were introduced: the bit and francs which were overlaid on the old cent and daler denominations.  The four units were related as 5 bits = 1 cent, 100 bits = 20 cents = 1 franc, 100 cents = 5 francs = 1 daler. Coins were issued each denominated in two units, bits and cents, francs and cents, or francs and daler.  Postage stamps were denominated in bits and francs; the lowest value was five bits.

United Kingdom, Commonwealth countries and Ireland
In Britain, Ireland and parts of the former British Empire, where before decimalisation a British-style currency of "pounds, shillings and pence" was in use, the word "bit" was applied colloquially to any of a range of low-denomination coins. Thus a threepence coin or "threepenny piece" was referred to as a "threepenny bit", usually pronounced "thrupny bit".

The term was used only for coins with a value of several named units (e.g., three pence), and never applied to  a penny, shilling, or half crown coin.

Although earlier there had been other values in circulation such as the "fourpenny bit" or "groat", the "bit" coins still in use in the United Kingdom up to decimalisation in 1971 were the two-shilling bit (or "florin") (often "two-bob bit"), the sixpenny bit (or "tanner"), and the threepenny bit.

In the UK, use of the term "bit" had already disappeared with the exception of the 'thruppeny bit', by the time British currency moved to decimal coinage and the consequential loss of the coin denominations to which it had applied. Thus a ten pence piece is referred to merely as "ten pence", or even "ten pee", not as a "tenpenny bit". The term 'pee' refers to the change in abbreviation of the British penny from 'd' to 'p' which denoted the 'New Penny'. 

The historic American adjective "two-bit" (to describe something worthless or insignificant) has a British equivalent in "tuppenny-ha'penny" – literally, worth two and a half (old) pence.

See also
Picayune
Spanish real
Spanish dollar
Danish West Indian daler
 List of alternative names for currency

References

Coins of the United States